Abortion is legal in Ethiopia in cases of rape, incest, or maternal problems relating to foetal impairment. In 2005, the Ethiopian Parliament constitutionally approved the legality of abortion in the given criteria. Currently abortions services in Ethiopian facilities includes medical abortion using misoprostol and Mifepristone, surgical abortion, manual vacuum aspiration and dilation and curettage.

In 2008, estimated 382,500 induced abortions were performed in Ethiopia, for annual rate of 23 abortions per 1,000 women aged 15–44.  This has been doubled the proportion in 2014, with rate of 53% (some 326,000) in all health facilities. Most abortions occur in non-governmental organization and private hospitals aboard Ethiopia.

Legality 
In 2005, Ethiopia legalized abortion in cases of rape, incest, or foetal impairment. Woman can legally terminate her child life if the pregnancy or childbirth endanger her life. Although abortion is prohibited by Criminal Code, the Ethiopian Parliament approved it in the following circumstances:

 When the pregnancy results from rape or incest
 When continuance of the pregnancy endangers the health or life of the woman or the fetes
 In cases of fetal abnormalities
 For women with physical or mental disabilities
 For minors who are physically or psychologically unprepared to raise a child
 In the case of grave and imminent danger that can be averted only through immediate pregnancy termination

A woman can terminate the child upon a difficulty of giving birth owing to minor or physical disability. However, the law engendered almost six in ten unsafe abortions in Ethiopia. In 2006, the government started national standard for safe abortion guideline that utilizes medications such as misoprostol with or without mifepristone) to terminate pregnancies, in accordance with World Health Organization (WHO) clinical recommendations on safe abortion. Available abortion services are:
 Medical abortion (Cytotec, misoprostol, Mifepristone)
 Surgical abortion
 Manual vacuum aspiration (MVA)
 Dilation and curettage (D&C)

Incidents
In 2008, an estimated 382,500 induced abortions were performed in Ethiopia, for annual rate of 23 abortions per 1,000 women aged 15–44. The abortion rate in Ethiopia was lower than to African and Eastern African countries which has 29% and 39% respectively according to WHO estimates. In urban areas, abortions rates is higher than in national average, such as Addis Ababa, Dire Dawa and Harar. Factors for these conditions include greater social and healthcare provision attracting women in these areas.

Some of 35% women tend to undergo induced abortion whereas 27% of those obtaining post-abortion care report having had a previous abortion. In 2014, about 620,300 abortions were performed in Ethiopia, corresponding to annual rate of 28 abortions per 1,000 women aged 15–49, an increase from 22 per 1,000 in 2008.

Provision of abortion and post-abortion care
In 2008, about 27% women induced abortions were safe performed by health facilities. However, 15% (58,000 abortions) reported safe despite lack of clear survey from private and public hospitals. Some of these practices were legal and mostly performed by private and small facilities; about half of all health facilities provided induced abortions in Ethiopia. The proportion is higher than for public hospitals (76%) and private or non-governmental facilities (63%) than for public health centers (41%).

This proportion is likely fluctuating, as there are abortion services in public facilities. Currently, private and NGO facilities mostly provide induced abortion aboard. Access to second trimester abortions is severely limited, in which 9–10% of all facilities only provide these services.

In 2014, legally performed induced abortions were reached 53% (some 326,200) in all health facilities, nearly double the proportion in 2008 (27%). Between 2008 and 2014, shared abortion rate increased from zero to more than one-third.

Unintended pregnancy and contraception
Modern contraceptive absorption is much higher than in Addis Ababa (57% among women aged 15–44) than in Ethiopia as whole (14%), while in rural areas is below national average (3–16%). One of root causes of abortion is the low level of contraceptive methods, which leads to unintended pregnancy. 13% of unintended pregnancy ended in 2014, up slightly from 10% in 2008.

References

Ethiopia
Ethiopia
Health in Ethiopia
Law of Ethiopia